Amit Dutta (born 1977 in Jammu) is an Indian experimental filmmaker and writer. He is considered to be one of the most significant contemporary practitioners of experimental cinema, known for his distinctive style of filmmaking rooted in Indian aesthetic theories and personal symbolism resulting in images that are visually rich and acoustically stimulating. His works mostly deal with subjects of art history, ethno-anthropology and cultural inheritance through cinema, many times merging research and documentation with an open imagination.

Life and career 
Amit Dutta graduated from the Film and Television Institute of India, Pune in 2004.
He has taught at the National Institute of Design (NID), Ahmedabad. In 2015, he joined Indian Institute of Advanced Study (IIAS), Shimla as a Tagore fellow.

Early works 
Amit Dutta began his career making several short experimental films which critics described as "without precedents except probably for a distant echo of Sergey Parajanov's avant-garde play with childhood memories, making the director probably the most singular and idiosyncratic in the world." His montages are considered as baffling the eye as well as the urge to interpret, being interwoven with a complex labyrinth of allusions from historical reminiscences, fairytales, children's stories, texture etc.

Kramasha (To Be Continued) (2007) 

Kramasha (To Be Continued), an experimental short film made in 2007, earned considerable acclaim from film scholars and critics and was considered to be a defining achievement in experimental cinema. After winning many national and international awards, it was included in the list of thousand best films of all times compiled by film critic Jonathan Rosenbaum who also described the film as "a dazzling, virtuoso piece of mise en scene in 35-millimeter, full of uncanny imagery about the way the narrator imagines the past of his village and his family."  It was also voted as one of the best films in the Senses of Cinema poll in 2007.

The FIPRESCI Jury while giving it the critic's prize in 2007 at the Oberhausen Film Festival in remarked, "Now that 35-millimeter appears to be a format whose pleasures are being overlooked or forgotten, especially in the realm of short films, the sensual pleasures of Amit Dutta's 22-minute To Be Continued (Kramasha) seem all the more precious…"

The Jury at the MIFF (Mumbai International Film Festival) while giving it the Golden Conch for the Best Film of the Festival in 2008 wrote about the film: "In the manner music keeps you quietly enthralled with a resonating sense of things without a need to necessarily reduce the experience to a verbalization of meanings, Kramasha offers a world of images and sounds that made us smell and touch the lush of nature amid a mysterious index of hallucinations. Like a dream that we may fail to understand but that reaches deep recesses of our unconscious and touches familiar chords, Amit Dutta's Kramasha weaves a powerful narrative that blends legends, myths and nostalgia into a film that allows us to recall our own early experiences."

Aadmi ki Aurat Aur Anya Kahaniyan (The Man's Woman and Other Stories) (2009) 

Kramasha is considered to explore the relationship between personal mythology, literary text, and the cinematic image. This exploration is seen continued in his consecutive fiction films The Man's Woman and Other Stories (2009) and the more recent The Golden Bird (2011).

The Man's Woman and Other Stories, a triptych of three separate short-stories received the Jury's Special Mention award of the Orizzonti [New Horizons] section of the 66th Venice Film Festival with the note that the film "opens a window on a new form of film-making on many levels". Jury-member and film-artist Bady Minck wrote that the director "creates images which are poetic and unsettling at the same time. They oscillate between the fantastic and the concrete, imagination and present-day reality".

Barbara Wurm, writing in the Senses of Cinema magazine states that the director "celebrates neo-expressionist cinematography and demonstrates outstanding skills in merging the tempus and the mode of narration, a very sophisticated plot wandering from reality to possibility and back being the result: Aadmi ki aurat aur anya kahaniya (The Man’s Woman and Other Stories)”

Sonchidi (The Golden Bird) (2011) 

In Sonchidi, two travelers journey in the quest for a flying craft that they believe would help them cross the cycle of births. The Rotterdam film festival described it as an "intriguing philosophical piece which evokes many memories, challenges various interpretations. Truly cinematic, a connoisseur's piece."

Nainsukh (2010) 

Since 2007 he collaborated with the art historian Dr Eberhard Fischer, researching in the Kangra Valley of Himachal Pradesh and eventually directed the feature film ‘Nainsukh’ in 2010.  The film is based on the biography of an 18th-century master painter of the same name belonging to the region. It premiered at the 67th Venice Film Festival, was presented in the ‘World Cinema Spotlight’ section of the San Francisco Film Festival, was showcased in MoMA, New York and travelled widely to many festivals including Rotterdam, Beijing and Vancouver Film Festivals among others. The ‘Film Comment’ magazine had rated ‘Nainsukh’ as one of the top ten films of the 67th Venice film festival.

Nainsukh has received a great deal of appreciation from both film and art critics. Prof. Dr. Milo C. Beach, the eminent American art historian, director emeritus Freer Gallery of Art, Washington DC., author of several authoritative books on Indian paintings wrote:

"The images of NAINSUKH are stunning. The comparisons with the paintings could not be more clear, but what astonishes me most is the ability of Amit Dutta to compose those images, and even more, to light them. The lighting is breathtaking. It tells you why Nainsukh would have taken such care with details, maybe especially with the folds of cloth…I think that this will do more for public interest in Indian painting that all the many scholarly essays.... What an achievement!" (If I were teaching, I would buy a copy of the film immediately to show in every class... )

Nainsukh has been widely discussed by critics for its unique formal qualities which evade categorisations. The film is said to be balancing between documentary approach and playful plot, developing its own visual language by interpreting as well as questioning Indian art history and one of its greatest artists.  While deeply rooted in Indian tradition and philosophy, the film is also seen by eminent critic Olaf Moller as a “thought-provoking investigation into the slippery, ever-changing nature of realism, its representation in the arts. A true masterpiece of Indian modernism.”

With no considerable dialogue, the almost silent film is considered to create "a hypnotic fusion of imagery and sound that conjures up a lost age".  George Heymont of Huffington Post also observes the lack of dialogue and calls the film “visually stunning and acoustically stimulating that its beauty can often take the viewer’s breath away” The film contains meticulous recreations of Nainsukh's miniatures through compositions set amidst the ruins of the Jasrota palace where the artist was retained. Galina Stoletneya remarks that "By harmoniously juxtaposing the gorgeous visuals with outstanding sound design, the filmmaker produces a unique work of art—a living painting itself—that stands on its own"

Max Goldberg of San Francisco Film Society observes that the film pays close attention to the finesse of Naisukh's brushwork and his observant images of the patron's more informal moments like smoking and beard-trimming. He adds that “When the filmmaker reconstructs one of Nainsukh’s more complexly staged scenes—as in the hunting of a tiger clutching its human prey—his cinematic technique of isolating different elements of a single scene evokes the dynamic register of imagination and realism animating the artist’s deceptively flat pictures.”

The Ferroni Brigade group of film critics had nominated it as one of the best films of the 67th Venice film festival.

Books 
Kaljayi Kambakht, his first novel in Hindi, was published in 2016. It received positive reviews and the author was awarded the Krishna Baldev Vaid Fellowship for outstanding contribution to Experimental Hindi Literature.Khud Se Kayi Sawal (Many Questions to Myself), is a selection from his journals as a film-student, translated into Hindi by writer Geet Chaturvedi in 2018.INVISIBLE WEBS: An art Historical inquiry into the life and death of Jangarh Singh Shyam (2018) is a book exploring the art-historical background of the art, life and suicide of the artist Jangarh Singh Shyam, who belonged to the Gond-Pardhan tribe of Central India. Its foreword is written by art-historian Partha Mitter.

Gyarah Rupay Ka Fountain Pen, a book of short-stories for children, published in 2021. It was included in Tata Trusts’ Parag Honours List 2022, as one of the best books for children, in an effort to promote good quality children’s literature in India.

 Other works 

After graduating from the film school in 2004, he spent many months interviewing painters from the Gond tribal community of Madhya Pradesh, who had migrated to the city of Bhopal following the success and untimely demise of one pioneering young Gond artist ‘Jangarh Singh Shyam’. It resulted in a film ‘Jangarh Film-One’, which revolves around his absence amidst his legacy in the contemporary art practice of his kin.

He also made a feature-length documentary ‘Ramkhind, a meditative observation of the everyday life of the people in a Warli village, which has produced some of the finest contemporary painters in its distinctive folk idiom.

Since Nainsukh in 2010, Amit Dutta’s area of interest has focused more specifically towards the art-historical and cultural aspects of the Kangra Valley and the surrounding area, most of his recent work being based in the same region.

In the years 2011–12, Amit Dutta recorded extensive conversations with another eminent Indian art-historian Dr.B.N.Goswamy, an authority on Pahari Art, for the production of an archive of his works in twenty volumes. Created during the archiving process are two shorts: ‘The Museum of Imagination’ and ‘Field-trip’.

‘The Museum of Imagination, A Portrait in Absentia’, is an abstract portrait of the art-historian. This film was first shown at the Rome Film Festival and then Rotterdam and Oberhausen Film Festivals subsequently. Rotterdam called it an extraordinary, intriguing and unconventional portrait.

Andrea Picard, Chief Curator of "Wavelengths", the Toronto International Film Festival's celebrated avant-garde section, and a columnist for Cinema Scope magazine wrote about the film that “Dutta continues his exploration of Indian art history and culture...The quietude in the film — the quest to understand the silences as much as the conversation — speaks volumes about the weight of art and creativity... While the film exudes precision and grace, its admiration and respect for its subject is awakened outward, never venerated into stasis. Studying art is a way of seeing the world; the film's official subtitle, "portrait in absentia" suggests infinitude as Dutta's discerning eye alludes to the images that will forever remain lodged in our memory spurring us on as a life force.”

 Screenings 

Amit Dutta’s films have been screened at various museums and film festivals:Museums:Museum of Modern Art (MoMA New York),  Metropolitan Museum of Art (New York),  Centre Pompidou(Paris), Tate London (London), Berkeley Art Museum and Pacific Film Archive (BAMPFA), The Academy of Arts of (Berlin), The Deutsches Historisches Museum (Berlin),  Weatherspoon Art Museum(NC), Reitberg Museum (Zurich),  Chandigarh Museum and art gallery (Chandigarh), Haus der Kulturen der Welt (Berlin), National Gallery of Modern Art NGMA (New Delhi), Logan Center for the Arts (Chicago).Festivals:Venice Film festival, Berlin Film festival, International Film Festival Rotterdam, 
San Francisco Film festival, Toronto International Film festival(TIFF Bell Lightbox), Oberhausen Film festival, Viennale, Cinema Du Reel,
Rome Film festival, Beijing Film festival, Bilbao International Film Festival Spain, Mumbai International Film festival, IFFI- International Film festival of India, Belfort Entreveus Film Festival (France), IDSFFK (Kerala), Media art festival, Osnabrueck (Germany), 25 Fps (Zagreb), Jeonju Film Festival (Korea), Vancouver International Film Festival.

 Awards and honors 
Amit Dutta's films have received a number of national and international awards including the Golden Conch and Best Film of the Festival Award at the Mumbai International Film Festival (MIFF), Gold Mikaldi at Bilbao (Spain), the FIPRESCI, International Film critic's award in the Oberhausen Film Festival, Germany, the John Abraham National Award (Federation of Film Societies of India, Keralam) and four times the National award of India.  Kramasha became one of the entries in Jonathan Rosenbaum's list of thousand best films in the Afterword of the second edition of his collection 'Essential Cinema'. 'The Man's Woman and Other Stories' won the Jury's special prize (Orrizonti-2009) in the 66th Venice Film Festival.  A retrospective/profile of his work was held at the Oberhausen film festival (Germany) in 2010.  He received the Hubert Bal Award of the Rotterdam International Film Festival for his screenplay The Invisible One in 2012. Some of his films were voted by film-critics as among the best in the years 2007 and 2009 in the 'Senses of Cinema'. The Ferroni Brigade group of film critics had named him among the Best New Filmmakers of the Decade in 2011.

A selection of his films have been archived by the Oberhausen film festival-Germany and have been shown at the Viennale, Museum of Modern Art (MoMA), Tate Modern Art Gallery, Venice Architecture Biennale and the Pompidou Center among others. In 2013, he was invited by the Venice Film Festival to make a short film for its 70th anniversary on the theme of the 'Future of Cinema'. In October 2013, he was conferred the title of honor, 'Dogra Ratna', for his contribution in the fields of Art and Culture. In 2015, he received CNAP award for his project on the History of Chess, by the Centre National des Arts Plastiques, France.

 Selected list 

 2005: National Award of India - Rajat Kamal (Silver Lotus)- Special Jury award for Direction (won)
 2005: National Award of India - Rajat Kamal (Silver Lotus) - Best Audiography (won) 
 2007: Gold Mikaldi, Best Film Award, Bilbao International Festival, Spain (won)
 2007: International Film Critic's Award (FIPRESCI) - The Oberhausen Film Festival, Germany (won)
 2007: Grand Prize – Oberhausen Film festival- Kramasha (nomination)
 2007: National Award of India - Rajat Kamal (Silver Lotus) - Best Cinematography (won)
 2007: John Abraham National Award, Best Experimental Film, (Federation of Film Societies of India, Keralam), Film Critic's Award (won)
 2007: National Award of India - Rajat Kamal (Silver Lotus) - Best Audiography (won)
 2007:  Award of the IFA grant - Extending Arts Practice (won)
 2007: National winner (Cinematography), Kodak Film school Competition, 2007 (won)
 2007: Royal Academy of Arts, London/ Zoo Art Fair/no.w.here invitation to exhibit the film concept 
 2007: Asia-pacific runner up for Cinematography, Kodak Film school Competition-`07 - Kramasha (won)
 2007: Master Class scholarship, Cinematographer invited as a scholar for the film Kramasha(won)
 2008: Golden Conch, Best film in the International Competition - Mumbai International Film Festival (MIFF) (won)
 2008: Best Film of the Festival Award - Mumbai International Film Festival (MIFF)(won)
 2009: Jury's special prize (Orrizonti-2009) - 66th Venice Film Festival(won) 
 2009: Venice Horizons Award – Venice Film festival - Aadmi Ki Aurat Aur Anya Kahaniya(nomination)
 2009: Luigi De Laurentiis Award - Venice Film Festival - Aadmi Ki Aurat Aur Anya Kahaniya(nomination)
 2009: Grand Prix – Entrevues Film Festival – Aadmi Ki Aurat Aur Anya Kahaniya (nomination)
 2009:  Grand Prize - Oberhausen Film festival- Jangarh Film-One(nomination)
 2009: Woosuk Award - Jeonju Film Festival –  Aadmi Ki Aurat Aur Anya Kahaniya(nomination)
 2009: International Film Critic's Prize (FIPRESCI) - VIENNALE - Aadmi Ki Aurat Aur Anya Kahaniya(nomination)
 2010: Honorary Retrospective - The International Short film festival, Oberhausen – Germany
 2010: Venice Horizons Award – Venice Film festival – Nainsukh(nomination)
 2010:  Grand Prix Janine Bazin Award - Entrevues Belfort Festival international du film- Nainsukh(nomination)
 2011: Best Student Film Award - Aadmi Ki Aurat Aur Anya Kahaniya - New Jersey Independent South Asian Cinefest(won)
 2011: Best New Filmmakers of the Decade - Ferroni Brigade group of film critics(won)
 2011: Nainsukh presented as the World Cinema Spotlight film: Painting with Light, at the 54th San Francisco International Film Festival 
 2011: Venice Horizons Award – Venice Film festival – Sonchidi (nomination)
 2011:  IFFR Audience Award - International Film Festival Rotterdam - Nainsukh - Nainsukh(nomination)
 2012: Hubert Bal Award of the Rotterdam International Film Festival(won)
 2012: CinemaXXI Award for Short and Medium – Rome Film festival – Museum of Imagination(nomination)
 2012: Grand Prize – Oberhausen film festival -  Museum of Imagination(nomination)
 2013: 'Dogra Ratna' Award for contribution in the fields of Art and Culture(won)
 2013: Tiger Award for Short Film – International Film Festival Rotterdam – Museum of Imagination (nomination)
 2013: Grand Prize – Oberhausen Film festival -  Field-Trip(nomination)
 2013: 70 Directors for Venice 70 - invited by the Venice Film Festival as one of the 70 directors who made the recent history of the Festival to celebrate the anniversary offering a short film.
 2014: Honored by the Indian Council for Cultural Relations (ICCR) for Nainsukh
 2014: Honorary Retrospective – Lalit Kala Akademi,
 2014:  IFFR Audience Award - International Film Festival Rotterdam- The Seventh Walk(nomination)
 2015: Honored by the government of Himachal Pradesh for Nainsukh
 2015: Honorary Retrospective - Through the looking Glass - Centre Pompidou, Paris, the 37th edition of Cinéma du Réel – France
 2015: Honorary Retrospective, Kerala State Chalachitra Academy - International Documentary and Short film Festival of Kerala (IDSFFK)
 2015: CNAP Award for his project on the History of Chess, by the Centre National des Arts Plastiques, France. (won)
 2015: Golden Berlin Bear – Berlin Film festival – Chitrashala(nomination) 
 2015:  Indian Panorama - International Film Festival of India- Even Red Can be Sad
 2015: Award of the Tagore Fellowship at the Indian Institute of Advanced Studies, Shimla
 2016: Grand Prize – Oberhausen film festival – Scenes from a Sketchbook(nomination)
 2016: Grand Prix – 25FPS film festival - Zagreb – Scenes from a Sketchbook (nomination)
 2016: Award of the Krishna Baldev Vaid Fellowship for outstanding contribution to Experimental Hindi Literature.
 2017: Honorary Retrospective -  LAC Lugano Arte e Cultura, Lugano, Switzerland.
 2017: Honorary Retrospective– Modernism by Other Means, Bombay Art Society, Mumbai.
 2017: Honorary Retrospective - Amit Dutta's Cinematic Museum, Berkeley Museum and Pacific Film Archives (BMPFA), University of California.
2018: Enlighten Award for his contribution to philosophy and art-history through films
 2018: Honorary Retrospective -  National Film Archive of India (NFAI), Pune
 2020: Special Tribute - The Ca' Foscari Short Film Festival—Venice, Italy

Retrospectives 

In March 2015, at the Centre Pompidou, Paris, the 37th edition of Cinéma du Réel conducted a major retrospective of 14 of his features and short-films, curated by eminent curator and film-critic Marie-Pierre Duhamel Muller entitled “Amit Dutta: Through the Looking Glass,” followed by a round table conference dedicated to discussing his work where using excerpts from Amit Dutta's films, the participants went over the different stages of his filmography and artistic path.

Marie-Pierre Duhamel in her introduction to the retrospective writes:

“Amit Dutta explores the expressive dimensions of cinema as a time machine. He builds up a universe for the spectator where research feeds the imaginary, where the arts, history and mythology form part of landscapes and gestures and where knowledge enchants reality.”  and that his body of work evokes “the philosophical majesty of the image.”

Amit Dutta's films have been compiled and screened as comprehensive retrospectives at several points in his career till now. The 56th International Short film festival, Oberhausen, curated the director's Profile in 2010 with seven of his short-films.Lalit Kala Akademi, Chandigarh, had organized the Cinema and Art festival showcasing a selection of both his short films and feature films hosted at the Government Museum and Art Gallery, Chandigarh, in March 2014.
In June 2015, the 8th International Documentary and Short film Festival of Kerala (IFFK) screened a retrospective of ten of his films hosted by the Kerala State Chalachitra Academy at Thiruvananthapuram.

Retrospectives (Selected List):

 2010 - International Short film festival, Oberhausen, Germany.
 2014 - Lalit Kala Akademi, Chandigarh, India.
 2015 - Through the looking Glass - Cinéma du Réel, Centre Pompidou, Paris, France.
 2015 - International Documentary and Short film Festival of Kerala (IFFK), India.
 2017 - LAC Lugano Arte e Cultura, Lugano, Switzerland.
 2017 - Amit Dutta's Cinematic Museum, Berkeley Museum and Pacific Film Archive (BMPFA), University of California.
 2017 - Modernism by Other Means, Bombay Art Society, Mumbai.
 2018 - National Film Archive of India (NFAI), Pune.
 2020 - The Inimitable Image—an Amit Dutta retrospective - MUBI
 2020 - Special tribute - The Ca’ Foscari Short Film Festival—Venice, Italy.
2021-  An Auteur's Palette- A festival of Amit Dutta's films—KNMA (Kiran Nadar Museum of Art)
2021- Amit Dutta's Cinematic Museum, Freer and Sackler Gallery—Smithsonian Museum, Washington, DC. 
2021- Surface and Depth: Recent Short Films by Amit Dutta—Berkeley Museum and Pacific Film Archive (BMPFA), University of California

Filmography

References

21st-century Indian film directors
Living people
1977 births
People from Jammu (city)
Indian experimental filmmakers
Film directors from Jammu and Kashmir